Mebonden or Mebond is the administrative centre of the municipality of Selbu in Trøndelag county, Norway.  It is located at the eastern end of the lake Selbusjøen at the mouth of the Nea River.  The villages of Vikvarvet, Hyttbakken, Innbygda, and Trøa surround the urban village of Mebonden. The 12th century Selbu Church is located in Mebonden.

References

Villages in Trøndelag
Selbu